John Nicholas Pelham, 9th Earl of Chichester (born 14 April 1944) is a British nobleman.

Chichester was born posthumously on 14 April 1944 to Ursula, Countess of Chichester; his father, John Pelham, 8th Earl of Chichester, had been killed in a road accident in February, while on active service with the Scots Guards, so he acceded to the earldom at birth. The Countess married Ralph Gunning Henderson in 1957, but they were divorced in 1971.

Chichester was educated at Stanbridge Earls School and in business as a farmer.

In 1975, Chichester married June Marijke Hall, the daughter of Group Captain Edward Preston Wells. They have one daughter:
Lady Eliza Catherine Pelham (born 1983)

They live at Little Durnford Manor, in Wiltshire.

Succession 
The title passes solely in the male line, so his heir presumptive is his second cousin, Richard Anthony Henry Pelham (b. 1952), who is the grandson of Henry George Godolphin Pelham, second son of the fifth Earl.

References

External links

1944 births
Living people
Earls of Chichester
John
Chichester